A mobile software content rating system is a rating system which is tailored to users of mobile software.

Comparison table
A comparison of current mobile software rating systems, showing age on the horizontal axis. Note however that the specific criteria used in assigning a classification can vary widely from one country/system to another. Thus a color code or age range cannot be directly compared from one country to another.

Key: 

  White  – No restrictions: Suitable for all ages / Aimed at young audiences / Exempt / Not rated / No applicable rating.
  Yellow  – No restrictions: Parental guidance is suggested for designated age range.
  Purple  – No restrictions: Not recommended for a younger audience but not restricted.	
  Red  – Restricted: Parental accompaniment required for younger audiences. (Not used)
  Black  – Prohibitive: Exclusively for older audience / Purchase age-restricted / Banned.

Existing systems

iOS and iPadOS App Store

Apple's rating system for the App Store follows the following rubric:

 Rated 4+: Contains no objectionable material.
 Rated 9+: May contain content unsuitable for children under the age of 9.
 Rated 12+: May contain content unsuitable for children under the age of 12.
 Rated 17+: May contain content unsuitable for children under the age of 17.

Apps rated 17+ are prohibited from purchase by younger users.

Google Play
Up until March 17, 2015 Google Play used the following rubric:

 Everyone
 Low maturity
 Medium maturity
 High maturity

Google now uses the International Age Rating Coalition (IARC) in most countries not represented by a rating authority, whilst countries or regions with a superimposed video game rating authority continues applying their own ratings where applicable. 
This includes Americas (except Brazil), where ESRB is imposed, Brazil with ClassInd, Europe and Israel with PEGI, Australia with ACB and South Korea with GRAC. However, a new Google Play Rating system is used exclusively in Russia and for non-gaming apps in South Korea. 
These ratings include:
 3+
 7+
 12+
 16+
 18+

In Australia, IARC applies its own ratings for non-gaming apps.

Samsung Galaxy Store

Huawei AppGallery
Huawei AppGallery developed own rating system.
Ratings are: 3+, 7+, 12+, 15+ and 18+

Amazon Appstore
On the Amazon Appstore, "All Ages" is for all ages. "Guidance Suggested" is for recommendation that parents should give guidance to pre-teens/children. "Mature" is recommended to be suitable for mature audiences. "Adult" is advertisements, graphic violence, nudity or other content only suitable for adult audiences.

Blackberry World
The Blackberry appstore as the following ratings:

 G (General) All ages
 T (Teen) May not be suitable for children under the age of 13
 M (Mature) May not be suitable for children under the age of 17
 A (Adult) Content that is generally recognized as appropriate only for, or that is legally restricted to, persons at least the age of majority in their region.

CTIA Mobile Application Rating System
The CTIA The Wireless Association, an industry trade group, collaborated with the ESRB to largely apply ESRB's rating system to mobile devices. It was launched in 2011, with Apple and Google being notable abstentions from subscribing companies.

Common Sense Media

 2+
 3+
 4+
 5+
 6+
 7+
 8+
 9+
 10+
 11+
 12+
 13+
 14+
 15+
 16+
 17+
 18+

See also
 Internet Content Rating Association
 Video game content rating system

References

External links
  on controlling what types of apps can be downloaded
 ESRB ratings

Mobile software